The Elancourt Templiers are a French American football team based in the city of Élancourt

The team plays in Ligue Élite de Football Américain and in European Football League.

The club is training and plays its games at the Complexe Sportif Europe of Élancourt, the club also plays some matches, European Cup at Stade Guy-Boniface, as the final EFAF Cup in 2005

Achievements 
 2005: Runner up EFAF Cup
 2008: Runner up Champion of France

External links 
 Elancourt Templiers official web site

American football teams in France
1986 establishments in France
American football teams established in 1986
Sport in Yvelines